The Zionist Organization Mizrachi was a political party in the interbellum Latvia during 1921-1934. It won some seats in Latvian parliamentary elections in 1922, 1925, 1928, and 1931.

The party was disbanded in 1934, after the Ulmanis authoritarian coup d'état, together with all other political parties.

See also
Mizrachi, for the meaning of the name of the party
Mordechai Nurock

References

Political parties of minorities in Latvia
Defunct political parties in Latvia
Jews and Judaism in Latvia
Jewish Latvian history
1934 disestablishments in Latvia
Political parties disestablished in 1934
Religious Zionist organizations
Zionism in Latvia
Zionist political parties in Europe